Bakcharsky District  is an administrative and municipal district (raion), one of the sixteen in Tomsk Oblast, Russia. It is located in the south of the oblast. Its administrative center is the rural locality (a selo) of Bakchar. Population: 13,419 (2010 Census);  The population of Bakchar accounts for 45.7% of the district's total population.

References

Notes

Sources

Districts of Tomsk Oblast